Marco Paulo Pereira Vasconcelos (born 7 November 1971) is a male badminton player from Portugal. Vasconcelos played a big role in helping the Portuguese team to win bronze at the Helvetia Cup in 2005. 

In his home country he won 15 titles at the Portuguese National Badminton Championships.  Vasconcelos is currently coaching the Brazil national badminton team.

Career 
Vasconcelos played badminton at the 2004 Summer Olympics in men's singles, losing in the round of 32 to Richard Vaughan of Great Britain. He also competed in the men's singles at the 2000 and 2008 Olympics, falling in the round of 64 on both occasions.

Achievements

BWF/IBF International Challenge/Series (1 title, 5 runners-up) 
Men's singles

Men's doubles

  BWF International Challenge tournament
  BWF International Series tournament
  BWF Future Series tournament

References

Portuguese male badminton players
Olympic badminton players of Portugal
Badminton players at the 2000 Summer Olympics
Badminton players at the 2004 Summer Olympics
Badminton players at the 2008 Summer Olympics
1971 births
Living people